L'Erable is an unincorporated community in Ashkum Township, Iroquois County, Illinois, United States.

Geography

Cemeteries
L'Erable Catholic Cemetery.

References

Unincorporated communities in Illinois
Unincorporated communities in Iroquois County, Illinois